The Hockney–Falco thesis is a theory of art history, advanced by artist David Hockney and physicist Charles M. Falco. Both claimed that advances in realism and accuracy in the history of Western art since the Renaissance were primarily the result of optical instruments such as the camera obscura, camera lucida, and curved mirrors, rather than solely due to the development of artistic technique and skill. Nineteenth-century artists' use of photography had been well documented.

In a 2001 book, Secret Knowledge: Rediscovering the Lost Techniques of the Old Masters, Hockney analyzed the work of the Old Masters and argued that the level of accuracy represented in their work is impossible to create by "eyeballing it".  Since then, Hockney and Falco have produced a number of publications on positive evidence of the use of optical aids, and the historical plausibility of such methods. The hypothesis led to a variety of conferences and heated discussions.

Setup of the 2001 publication
Part of Hockney's work involved collaboration with Charles Falco, a condensed matter physicist and an expert in optics.  While the use of optical aids would generally enhance accuracy, Falco calculated the types of distortion that would result from specific optical devices; Hockney and Falco argued that such errors could in fact be found in the work of some of the Old Masters.

Hockney's book prompted intense and sustained debate among artists, art historians, and a wide variety of other scholars.  In particular, it has spurred increased interest in the actual methods and techniques of artists among scientists and historians of science, as well as general historians and art historians.  The latter have in general reacted unfavorably, interpreting the Hockney–Falco thesis as an accusation that the Old Masters "cheated" and intentionally obscured their methods.  Physicist David G. Stork and several co-authors have argued against the Hockney–Falco thesis from a technical standpoint.

Hockney and Falco's theory has already inspired an increase in research regarding the use of optics throughout the history of art. For instance, there was the case of the decade-long research on Rembrandt's works conducted by painter Francis O'Neill. In the published paper he wrote with Sofia Palazzo Corner entitled, Rembrandt's Self-portraits, O'Neill presented recurring themes in the painter's works that serve as evidence in his use of mirrors, particularly, in his self-portraits. These include the use of chiaroscuro, which is a signature of the lighting conditions necessary for projections as well as Rembrandt's off-center gaze in his self-portraits, which - according to O'Neill - indicated that the artist might have been looking at a projection surface off to the side rather than straight onto a flat mirror.

Origins of the thesis
 

Aaron Scharf's 1968 book Art and Photography, which details evidence of the use of photographs and the camera by painters, is referred to by Hockney in his 1977 painting My Parents (Tate, London) in which his father is depicted attentively reading the volume. Scharf notes in his introduction that in 1568 Daniele Barbaro, the Venetian writer on architecture, recommended the camera obscura as an aid to artists: "By holding the paper steady you can trace the whole perspective outline with a pen, shade it, and delicately colour it from nature." As described in Secret Knowledge, in January 1999 during a visit to the National Gallery, London, Hockney conceived of the idea that optical aids were the key factor in the development of artistic realism.  He was struck by the accuracy of portraits by Jean Auguste Dominique Ingres, and became convinced that Ingres had used a camera lucida or similar device.  From there, Hockney began looking for signs of the use of optical aids in earlier paintings, creating what he called the Great Wall in his studio  by organizing images of great realistic art by time period.  What he saw as a sudden rise of realism around 1420, combined with Charles Falco's suggestion that concave mirrors could have been used in that period to project images, was the germ of the Hockney–Falco thesis.

In 2000, Falco and Hockney published an analysis ("Optical Insights into Renaissance Art") of the likely use of concave mirrors in Jan van Eyck's work in Optics & Photonics News, vol. 11.  In 2001, Hockney published an extended form of his argument in Secret Knowledge.

The hypothesis that technology was used in the production of Renaissance Art was not much in dispute in early studies and literature. The 1929 Encyclopædia Britannica contained an extensive article on the camera obscura and cited Leon Battista Alberti as the first documented user of the device as early as 1437. The discussion started by the Hockney–Falco thesis ignored the abundant evidence for widespread use of various technical devices, at least in the Renaissance, and, e.g., Early Netherlandish painting.

Hockney's argument

In Secret Knowledge, Hockney argues that early Renaissance artists such as Jan van Eyck and Lorenzo Lotto used concave mirrors; as evidence, he points to the chandelier in Van Eyck's Arnolfini Portrait, the ear in Van Eyck's portrait of Cardinal Albergati, and the carpet in Lotto's Husband and Wife.  Hockney suggests that later artists, beginning with Caravaggio, used convex mirrors as well, to achieve a large field of view.

Secret Knowledge recounts Hockney's search for evidence of optical aids in the work of earlier artists, including the assembly of a "Great Wall" of the history of Western art.  The 15th century work of Jan van Eyck seems to be the turning point, he argues, after which elements of realism became increasingly prominent.  He correlates shifts toward increased realism with advances in optical technologies.  The argument of Secret Knowledge is primarily a visual one, as Hockney was largely unable to determine when and how optical aids were used by textual or direct evidence.

Falco and Ibn al-Haytham
At a scientific conference in February 2007, Falco further argued that the Arabic physicist Ibn al-Haytham's (965–1040) work on optics, in his Book of Optics, may have influenced the use of optical aids by Renaissance artists. Falco said that his and Hockney's examples of Renaissance art "demonstrate a continuum in the use of optics by artists from c. 1430, arguably initiated as a result of Ibn al-Haytham's influence, until today."

Criticism

Artist's skill
Art historians and others have criticized Hockney's argument on the grounds that the use of optical aids, though well-established in individual cases, has little value for explaining the overall development of Western art, and that historical records and paintings and photographs of art studios (without optical devices), as well as present-day realist artists, demonstrate that high levels of realism are possible without optical aids.

Optical distortion
In addition to incredulity on the part of art historians and critics of modern art, some of the harshest criticism of the Hockney–Falco thesis came from another expert in optics, image processing and pattern recognition, David G. Stork.  Stork analyzed the images used by Falco and Hockney, and came to the conclusion that they do not demonstrate the kinds of optical distortion that curved mirrors or converging lenses would cause. Falco has claimed that Stork's published criticisms have relied on fabricated data and misrepresentations of Hockney and Falco's theory. Stork has rebutted this claim.

Renaissance optics

Critics of the Hockney–Falco theory claim that the quality of mirrors and optical glass for the period before 1550 and a lack of textual evidence (excluding paintings themselves as "documentary evidence") of their use for image projection during this period casts doubt on the theory. Historians are more inclined to agree about the possible relevance of the thesis between 1550 and the invention of the telescope, and cautiously supportive after that period, when there clearly was interest and capacity to project realistic images; 17th century painters such as Johannes Vermeer and Gaspar van Wittel used optical devices in a variety of ways, though not the ways postulated by Hockney.

Leaving the technical optical arguments aside, historians of science investigated several aspects of the historical plausibility of the thesis in a 2005 set of articles in Early Science and Medicine.  In his introduction to the volume, Sven Dupré claimed the Hockney–Falco analysis rests heavily on a small number of examples, "a few dozen square centimeters" of canvas that seem to show signs that optical devices were used.

Image projection

Leonardo da Vinci's notebooks include several designs for creating concave mirrors. Leonardo also describes a camera obscura in his Codex Atlanticus of 1478–1519.

The camera obscura was well known for centuries and documented by Ibn al-Haitham in his Book of Optics of 1011–1021. In 13th-century England Roger Bacon described the use of a camera obscura for the safe observation of solar eclipses, exactly because the viewer looks at the projected image and not the sun itself.

David Lindberg's A Catalogue of Medieval and Renaissance Optical Manuscripts (Pontifical Institute of Medieval Studies, 1974) lists 61 manuscripts written in the years 1000–1425. These manuscripts not only describe methods for making mirrors and parabolic mirrors but also discuss their use for image projection.

Optical glass
Sara J. Schechner claimed that surviving glassware from the 15th and 16th centuries is far too imperfect to have been used to create realistic images, while "even thinking about projecting images was alien to the contemporary conceptual frame of mind."
Vincent Ilardi, a historian of Renaissance optical glass, subsequently argued against Schechner's conclusions based on surviving glassware, suggesting that the present condition of Renaissance glassware is not likely to reflect the optical quality of such glassware when it was new.  Ilardi documents Lorenzo Lotto's purchase of a high-priced crystal mirror in 1549, bolstering the Hockney–Falco thesis in Lotto's case.

Furthermore, even normal eyeglasses (spectacles) can also project images of sufficient optical quality to support the Hockney–Falco thesis and such eyeglasses, along with magnifying glasses and mirrors, were not only available at the time, but actually pictured in 14th century paintings by artists such as Tommaso da Modena.

Dutch draper and pioneering microbiologist Antonie van Leeuwenhoek (1632–1723), a contemporary of artist Vermeer (and an executor for Vermeer when he died in 1675) in Delft was known to have exceptional lens making skills, having created single small lenses capable of 200x magnification, far exceeding those of more complex compound microscopes of the period. Indeed, his feats of lens making were not matched for a considerable time as he kept aspects of their construction secret; in the 1950s, C.L. Stong used thin glass thread fusing instead of polishing to recreate Leeuwenhoek design microscopes.  It was long believed that Antonie van Leeuwenhoek was a master lens grinder (a notion repeated in the recent BBC television documentary "Cell"). However, it is now believed that he came upon a relatively simple method of making small, high quality glass spheres by heating and manipulating a small rod of soda lime glass.

Metal mirrors
On his website, Falco also claims Schechner overlooked manuscript evidence for the use of mirrors made from steel and other metals, as well as numerous metal artifacts that belie the claim that sufficiently large and reflective metal mirrors were unavailable, and that other contributors to the Early Science and Medicine volume relied on Schechner's mistaken work in dismissing the thesis.

Earlier evidence of the use of optical tools

Don Ihde called the hypothesis being 'hyped' and referred to clear evidence about the use of optical tools by, e.g., Albrecht Dürer and Leonardo da Vinci and others. As well the 1929 Encyclopædia Britannica contains an extensive article on the camera obscura and cites Leon Battista Alberti as the first documented user of the device as early as 1437. Ihde states abundant evidence for widespread use of various technical devices at least in the Renaissance and e.g. in Early Netherlandish painting. Jan van Eyck's 1434 painting Arnolfini Portrait shows a convex mirror in the centre of the painting. Van Eyck also left his signature above this mirror, showing the importance of the tool. The painting includes a crown glass window in the upper left side, a rather expensive luxury at the time. Van Eyck was rather fascinated by glass and its qualities, which was as well of high symbolic importance for his contemporaries. Early optical instruments were comparatively expensive in the Medieval age and  the Renaissance.

See also
 Tim's Vermeer, a 2013 documentary film showing Tim Jenison's hypothesis: Vermeer might have created his paintings aided by an optical device, as Jenison demonstrates by recreating a Vermeer painting.

References

External links
 FAQ by Charles Falco — a summary of the physical and historical evidence
 FAQ by David G. Stork — another physicist's response to Hockney–Falco thesis
 Comments — two contemporary paintings depicting complex chandeliers painted entirely by eye.

Art history
History of technology
21st-century controversies
David Hockney